Events in the year 1965 in Bulgaria.

Incumbents 
 General Secretaries of the Bulgarian Communist Party: Todor Zhivkov
 Chairmen of the Council of Ministers: Todor Zhivkov

Events 
 Officials in the Bulgarian Communist Party and officers in the Bulgarian People's Army attempted a coup d'état against the party leadership and specifically General-Secretary Todor Zhivkov. However, a counter-intelligence operation discovered these plans before the coup could be carried out.

Sports 

 The 5th European Women's Artistic Gymnastics Championships were held in Sofia.

References 

 
1960s in Bulgaria
Years of the 20th century in Bulgaria
Bulgaria
Bulgaria